Bonnyton Thistle Football Club is a Scottish football team based in the Bonnyton area in the town of Kilmarnock, East Ayrshire. They are members of the  West of Scotland Football League, in the sixth tier of the Scottish football league system, having joined the league in 2020 from the South of Scotland Football League.

Founded in 1912, they were previously a youth and amateur team.

Their home ground is The Synergy Arena, located in the Townholm area of Kilmarnock, which has a capacity of 1,000. It was opened in 2017 to coincide with the club's move into senior football.

Honours

Cup 
 Southern Counties Cup/ Challenge Cup
Winners (1) : 2018–19.
 Alba Cup
 Winners (1) : 2018–19.
 Detroit Trophy – Overall Championship
Winners (1) : 2018–19.

Notable former players 

 Craig Conway
 Alan Mahood
 Neil McGowan
 Derek Stillie
  Thomas O'Ware

References

External links

Football clubs in Scotland
Association football clubs established in 1912
1912 establishments in Scotland
South of Scotland Football League teams
Sport in Kilmarnock
West of Scotland Football League teams
Football in East Ayrshire